Mathieu Bozzetto (born 16 November 1973) is a professional snowboarder from France. His specialties are the parallel slalom and parallel giant slalom.

Career highlights

Olympic Winter Games
1998 – Nagano, 5th at giant slalom
2002 – Salt Lake City, 6th at parallel giant slalom
2006 – Torino, 4th at parallel giant slalom
2010 – Vancouver,  Bronze medal at parallel giant slalom
FIS World Snowboard Championships
1997 – Innichen, 4th at giant slalom
1999 – Berchtesgaden, 14th at giant slalom
1999 – Berchtesgaden, 13th at parallel gs
1999 – Berchtesgaden,  2nd at parallel slalom
2001 – Madonna di Campiglio, 86th at giant slalom
2001 – Madonna di Campiglio, 5th at parallel slalom
2001 – Madonna di Campiglio, 8th at parallel gs
2003 – Kreischberg, 4th at parallel giant slalom
2003 – Kreischberg, 2nd  at parallel slalom
2007 – Arosa, 10th at parallel gs
2007 – Arosa, 5th at parallel slalom
World Cup
1998 – Grächen,  2nd at giant slalom
1998 – Tandadalen,  2nd at parallel gs
1998 – Ischgl,  3rd at parallel slalom
1999 – Morzine,  1st at parallel slalom
1999 – Morzine,  2nd at parallel gs
1999 – Park City,  1st at parallel slalom
1999 – Park City,  3rd at giant slalom
1999 – Asahikawa,  1st at parallel slalom
1999 – Naeba,  2nd at parallel slalom
1999 – Olang,  1st at parallel gs
1999 – Olang,  1st at parallel slalom
1999 – Whistler,  1st at giant slalom
1999 – Mont-Sainte-Anne,  1st at giant slalom
2000 – Morzine,  1st at parallel slalom
2000 – Berchtesgaden,  1st at parallel slalom
2000 – Gstaad,  2nd at giant slalom
2000 – Tandadalen,  1st at parallel gs
2000 – Tandadalen,  1st at parallel slalom
2000 – Ischgl,  1st at parallel slalom (1)
2000 – Livigno,  1st at parallel slalom
2000 – Livigno,  1st at giant slalom
2000 – Ischgl,  1st at parallel slalom (2)
2001 – Kreischberg,  1st at parallel slalom
2001 – Bad Gastein,  3rd at parallel slalom
2001 – München,  3rd at parallel slalom
2001 – Berchtesgaden,  1st at parallel slalom
2001 – Berchtesgaden,  3rd at parallel gs
2001 – Ruka,  3rd at parallel gs
2001 – Valle Nevado,  1st at parallel slalom
2001 – Tignes,  3rd at parallel gs
2001 – Ischgl,  1st at parallel gs
2001 – Mont-Sainte-Anne,  1st at parallel slalom
2002 – Arosa,  3rd at parallel gs
2002 – Sapporo,  1st at parallel gs
2002 – Sapporo,  2nd at parallel slalom
2002 – Ruka,  3rd at parallel slalom
2002 – Sölden,  1st at parallel gs
2002 – Sölden,  1st at parallel slalom
2002 – Tandadalen,  2nd at parallel slalom
2002 – Whistler,  1st at parallel slalom
2002 – Stoneham,  1st at parallel gs
2003 – Bad Gastein,  1st at parallel slalom
2003 – Maribor,  3rd at parallel slalom
2003 – Sapporo,  1st at parallel gs
2003 – Sapporo,  1st at parallel slalom
2003 – Serre Chevalier,  3rd at parallel gs
2003 – Serre Chevalier,  3rd at parallel slalom
2003 – Arosa,  2nd at parallel gs
2003 – Stoneham,  2nd at parallel gs
2004 – Bad Gastein,  2nd at parallel slalom
2004 – Alpe d'Huez,  1st at parallel gs
2004 – Sapporo,  1st at parallel gs
2004 – Sapporo,  1st at parallel slalom
2004 – Mount Bachelor,  2nd at parallel gs
2004 – Bardonecchia,  2nd at parallel gs
2005 – Sierra Nevada,  2nd at parallel slalom
2006 – Kreischberg,  2nd at parallel gs
2006 – Shukolovo,  2nd at parallel slalom
2007 – Nendaz,  2nd at parallel slalom (1)
2007 – Sungwoo,  3rd at parallel gs
2007 – Landgraaf,  1st at parallel slalom
2007 – Nendaz,  1st at parallel slalom (2)
2008 – Bad Gastein,  1st at parallel slalom
South American Cup
2000 – Cerro Catedral,  1st at parallel gs
FIS Races
2000 – Chapelco,  1st at parallel gs
2001 – Alpe d'Huez,  1st at parallel gs
2002 – Chamonix,  1st at parallel gs

References

External links
 

1973 births
Living people
French male snowboarders
Olympic snowboarders of France
Snowboarders at the 1998 Winter Olympics
Snowboarders at the 2002 Winter Olympics
Snowboarders at the 2006 Winter Olympics
Snowboarders at the 2010 Winter Olympics
Olympic bronze medalists for France
Sportspeople from Chambéry
Olympic medalists in snowboarding
Medalists at the 2010 Winter Olympics
21st-century French people